Doze Niu (also known as Niu Chen-zer; born June 22, 1966) is a Taiwanese actor, film director, show host, screenwriter, and producer. As a film director, he is best known for the Taiwanese film Monga.

Early life 
Niu was born in Taipei, Taiwan on June 22, 1966. He grew up in the military dependents' village in Gongguan, Taipei. His father's family is from the Manchu Niohuru clan and his mother's family has military background. His grandfather was a general, so he would often accompany him to visit Chiang Kai-shek. When he was 12, his father was diagnosed with amyotrophic lateral sclerosis and became bed-ridden for 25 years until his death.

His love for Hong Kong cinema may have influenced his later works.

Career
Niu started his acting at the age of 9. He was 17 when he was nominated for his first Golden Horse Award in 1983 for Growing Up.

These early successes did not help his career as he grew older. At the age of 19, Niu could not find any roles in films, so he started hanging out with his so-called "corner brothers" and improved his Taiwanese tremendously.  By speaking fluent Taiwanese, he was able to get along with the Taiwanese people even though his family originated from Beijing.

Niu is the founder of the production company Red Bean Production Co, which was created in August 2002. He participated in all three movies that he directed but vowed to not appear in any more movies so that he can focus entirely on directing.

As of 2018, Niu is shooting his new film Pao Ma.

Controversies

Carrier intrusion 
In June 2013, he brought Chinese cinematographer Cao Yu into the Navy base in Zhuoying under a false name. The incident was revealed by their photo together on an aircraft carrier. These actions violated certain laws of the Ministry of National Defense. The Navy command investigated it as possible intrusion, which can carry a five-year sentence. On July 16, 2013, Niu admitted his wrongdoing in the court in Kaoshiong and paid NT$200,000 for bail. He told the media that he didn't know he broke the law.

Sexual assault allegations 
On 5 December 2018, a female crew member on the set of Pao Ma filed a police report accusing Niu of sexually assaulting her the previous month. He was subsequently questioned by police officers of the Da'an Precinct and the Taipei District Prosecutors Office, and was indicted in January 2019. Niu was formally charged with rape in February 2019. An appeal to the Taiwan High Court was heard in April 2020, and he was sentenced to four years imprisonment. The High Court ruling was upheld as the Supreme Court rejected Niu's appeal in September 2021.

Features

What on Earth Have I Done Wrong?!
What on Earth Have I Done Wrong is the first dramatic film that Niu directed. He was also the main actor. Although the movie is not an autobiography, there are a lot of resemblances between him and the character.  The character in the movie is also a director attempting to gather enough money to produce a mockumentory film. The film was initially about the politics in Taiwan; however, Niu took a completely different turn with the film and focused the film on the character.  A lot of media commented that this film is a half-biography or a documentary. The film was nominated for the best picture award at the Golden Horse Film Festival and it won the FIPRESCI Prize.

Monga
Monga is a gangster movie that takes place in the Wanhua District of Taipei and has a cast of mainly young actors like Mark Chao and Ethan Juan.  Niu also participated in the movie as the head of the gang from the Chinese mainland.  The movie was a box office success, grossing more than US$1.8 million in Taiwan.

The film was selected as the Taiwanese entry for the Best Foreign Language Film at the 83rd Academy Awards.

Filmography

Film

Television

Music videos
Niu directed music videos for Richie Ren Xian-QI's "wu ni jiu wu wo" and Jasmine Leong's "di san zhe".

Awards and nominations
Growing Up (小畢的故事) 1983 Golden Horse Film Festival best supporting actor nomination
1984 China Art Film Performance Award Medal
After the game (遊戲之後) 1987 Golden Bell Award best actor nomination
Awakening (甦醒) 1989 Golden Bell Award best actor nomination
Banana Paradise (香蕉天堂) 1989 Golden Horse Film Festival best actor nomination
Fei Tian (飛天) 1996 Golden Horse Film Festival best supporting actor nomination
Xiaoguang (曉光) 2000 Golden Bell Award best actor nomination
What on Earth have I done wrong?! (情非得已之生存之道) 2007 Golden Horse Film Festival FIPRESCI Prize
Wayward Kenting (我在墾丁*天氣晴) 2008 Golden Bell Award drama director award nomination

See also
Manchu people in Taiwan

References

External links
 

1966 births
Living people
20th-century Taiwanese male actors
21st-century Taiwanese male actors
Film directors from Taipei
Male actors from Taipei
Taiwanese male film actors
Taiwanese male television actors
Taiwanese people of Manchu descent
Taiwanese rapists
Manchu male actors